Byrd Gibbens (born 1936) is an American historian and professor.

Career 

 she was a professor of English at the University of New Mexico.

Selected publications 

 This is a Strange Country: Letters of a Westering Family, 1880-1906 (1988, University of New Mexico Press)
 Far from Home: Families of the Westward Journey  by Lillian Schlissel, Byrd Gibbens, and Elizabeth Hampsten (2002, U of Nebraska Press:

References

External links
 

American women historians
University of New Mexico faculty
1936 births
Living people
21st-century American women